Lottbek is a small stream in Schleswig-Holstein and Hamburg, Germany. It flows into the Bredenbek near Bergstedt.

See also
List of rivers of Schleswig-Holstein
List of rivers of Hamburg

Rivers of Schleswig-Holstein
Rivers of Hamburg
Rivers of Germany